is a Japanese tarento, race queen and gravure idol.

Currently, she works freelance instead of being associated with an agency.

Biography
She was born in Aoi-ku, Shizuoka, Shizuoka Prefecture. She is the fifth of six siblings (with three brothers and two sisters). After graduating from high school, she joined a modeling club in Shizuoka Prefecture and debuted as a local model with the stage name . Starting in April 1986, she made regular appearances for one year on the late-night informational programme Jōhō Kōsaten Do! at the local station TV Shizuoka. At that time, she used the stage name .

She left the aforementioned programme and went to Tokyo in May 1987, and changed the agency she worked with. She made her nationwide debut on 11PM. She changed to her current stage name of Natsuki Okamoto.

In the 1990s, she became widely active as a sexy-type of tarento in a similar vein as Ai Iijima and Aya Sugimoto. She also appeared on dramas as an actress.

In 1991, she starred in the Toei V-Cinema direct-to-video film , an installment of the Joshū Sasori series, where she gained popularity. She was scheduled to star again in the full cinema version of the film, but it was canceled when she stepped down from the role. The reasons given for her resignation were the decion to take a break for her health and arguments over her refusal to go nude. She used this opportunity to put her entertainment work on hold, during which time there were reports on theories regarding her mental health as well as her severe weight loss. She changed agencies during this time.

After that, she became a regular on the television variety programme, Hey! Say! A Board of Education, where she acted like an airhead and often gave off-the-wall responses. She shifted from being a tarento selling her sex appeal to a casual character up for anything.

In June 1995, she caused a scene at her hotel which resulted in police being dispatched, leading to talk about her. This was followed closely by a report of her causing trouble returning items at a cosmetics store, resulting in articles claiming there was a plan to eliminate her from the entertainment industry. That same year, it was reported her staff broke away from her

She was removed from the show Shinkon-san Irasshai at the end of March 1996 due to her prioritizing her appearances on stage, after having appeared on the show since 1992. At the same time, she lost her status as a regular on the shows Hey! Say! A Board of Education, Ken Shimura no Daijōbudaa, and Monomane Ōzakettei-sen broadcast on Fuji Television, which left her with no regular positions on programs by April 1996. She received fewer offers for work during this period, and she looked back on that time as a period where she was "getting scolded."

Her television appearances were rare in the 2000s, but she appeared frequently in golf pro-am tournaments. She made regular appearances in the late-night television programme Yorubijo in April 2005. Prior to that in February of the same year, she appeared in Cream Nantoka as a mother in a skating rink. After that, she had almost no work until 2010, though she was regularly appearing at the local Shizuoka Asahi Television in Tobikkiri! Shizuoka during that period.

In September 2009, she made a guest appearance on a project modeled after the TV program, Ano Hito wa Ima!?, and tried to go on the show in a high-leg swimsuit similar to what she became known for wearing during her Nissin Cup Noodle Racing Team race queen years, but another member of the cast covered her with their coat.

She opened her blog for the first time at a repdigit of 2:22:22 on 2 February 2010. Although she was in her forties, the number of accesses in the gravure idol division of Ameba Blog became the first place, she was in another breakthrough and her entertainment activities were resumed full-scale since the same year. At the same time, since her activities as a gravure idol were also resumed, it came to be called "Japan's oldest age and gravure idol of 40 generations." She had many offers such as talk shows. Greeting is much "Konya Konyachiwa~ Ohisashi brief, Okamoto Natsuki desu." Many times she spoke with "mambo" at the end of her words such as "bikkuri mambo yo" (surprised mambo).  states that it is a phrase that she thought during the incubation period.

After the Tōhoku earthquake and tsunami of 2011, she thought that there is nothing she can do volunteer activities taking place in the disaster area frequently, and on her blog dated 7 June she wrote to make it interpret as a cease of entertainment activities. However, when writing on 12 June, she denied it.

On 1 August 2013, she succeeded in climbing Mount Fuji where she was attracted by charm. This pattern was broadcast at 5-Ji ni Muchū! on 20 and 27 August of the same year.

From October 2011 and March 2016, Tokyo's local television station Tokyo MX's 5-Ji ni Muchū! stepped down as Tuesday regular.

In May 2017, she returned to the television for the first time in about a year with the special edition of Cream Nantoka broadcast by AbemaTV.

Personal life

Nominal profile problem
The content of the profile published about Okamoto has often been raised doubt, and its content is often described as "self-describing."

Age misrepresentation
Born in 1967, she was younger her than real age, and in February 1991 it was reported that she was not 23 but actually 25, later she was born in 1965 and her profile was changed.

In 1995 it was reported that there was a rumour that in Shūkan Josei, she was 35 years old. She ate 37 beans at Setsubun at the television talk show Lion no Gokigenyou broadcast on 3 February 1997, two years later, which is supposed to eat the same number as the age, actually she revealed she was 37 years old. About this, the person herself said in 2010, "I tried to eat a lot of beans at once in order to make you laugh."

The allegation of age spoofing recurred around 2000, but Okamoto herself continued a stance that could be taken as a midway affirmation about the truth of suspicion, and calmed down as soon as tacit consent.

In the 2010s, she had disclosed an identity document to prove her date of birth, and in Jōhō Live Miyane-ya on 17 December 2010, she actually released a driver's license stated as "12 September 1965" in the broadcast. Okamoto talks that, "please go to pick up your family register," "even if I show my health insurance certificate I do not believe my actual age," etc., even though she herself makes a suspicion about age spoofing.

Friendship
She was a colleague when she served as a race queen of the Nissin Cup Noodle Racing Team in 1990, and had friendship with Izumi Sakai (Zard), which later became popular as a singer. Sakai suddenly died in 2007 and commented that Okamoto went to a karaoke box with Sakai and several staffs during their race queen years, Sakai had a song  "for you…" of Mariko Takahashi, and when listening to her singing, Sakai revealed the episode that said "If this singing voice is such a good song, you may be the best singer."

Her entertainment office Titan's President Mitsuyo Ota and politician Renhō worked together with Okamoto at the tarento years and was working on a unit called "Hyōryū Gals." After that, she went to play at the house of Mitsuyo, where she met Bakushō Mondai. After that, the duo made their breakthrough and they had become estranged since. The duo frequently use Okamoto to appear on radio and appeared irregularly in the VTR of Sunday Japon from 2010. After that, she co-starred on the program, she herself said "I have not seen them for the first time in 20 years." In an interview at the time of an event in June 2011, she touched Mitsuyo at the office, but confess that he was refused. There is also a long-standing friendship with Terry Ito.

In addition to this, Aya Sugimoto who was active in entering the entertainment industry at the same time as Okamoto and also familiar with Akira Hokuto who is co-starring at 5-Ji ni Muchū!.

Stage name
On the origin of the name "Natsuki Okamoto", the surname "Oka" was from the hometown Shizuoka, and from the professional golfer Ayako Okamoto who was active at the time.

The reason for renaming "Yuki Hayakawa" to "Natsuki Okamoto" was because Youki Kudoh was her senior of Hirata Office where she was affiliated at the time and Okamoto was said to be "confusing" from the office staff, and was told from her office that they "need to print a promotional brochure, so decide within 2 hours!" and renamed.

Episodes
She lived in a house in Shizuoka when she became a popular person, and later purchased apartments in Gifu and Tokyo. Her stagnation period was said to have lived with rent income. Furthermore, in an interview published in the magazine Fujin Kōron on 22 November 2011, she said that she had been simulating a rental income by lending an apartment when it comes to an emergency.
She admitted to undergoing cosmetic surgery, but said she has not had breast implants. She also said she has refused to appear on adult videos. She has atopic dermatitis.
In the early days of the manga Crayon Shin-chan, together with tarentos Fumie Hosokawa and Komiya Etsuko, their favourite character is the protagonist Shinnosuke Nohara. In addition, weather commentator Toshio Fukui and political critic Ryuichiro Hosokawa talks as "a celebrity whose name is known only."

Appearances

Variety–information
Jōhō Kōsaten Do! (SUT) Apr 1986—about 2 years, programme sub MC (on her own name "Yuuki Hayakawa", her first regular television appearance)
Hey! Say! A Board of Education (Oct 1991 – Mar 1993, CX) – Hobo Kaikin
Sekai no Chō Gōka Chinpin Ryōri (1991–96, CX) – quasi-regular
Ken Shimura no Daijōbudaa (CX)
Shinkon-san Irasshai (24 May 1992 – 31 Mar 1996, ABC) – 5th assistant
Kaikai! Takada Byōin e Ikō (4 Oct 1992 – 28 Mar 1993, CTV) – moderator with Junji Takada (as Fuchō)
Naruhodo! The World (1992–96, CX) – temporary reporter. She also appeared as a studio solver rarely.
Roba no Mimi sōji (1994–96, NTV)
Tensai Takeshi no Genki ga Deru TV (NTV) – as a member of "~Busters" series, always accompanied the location wearing a high-leg swimsuits.
Sekaimaru Mie! TV Tokusō-bu (NTV) – quasi-regular in the first half of the 1990s
Cream Nantoka (EX) – in the entertainment industry Binkan championships, they are almost regulars and appeared irregularly in other corners.
Shirushiru Mishiru (EX) – made of the same staff as Cream Nantoka. On 19 May 2010 broadcast programme, image girls and things.
Tobikkiri! Shizuoka – Friday irregular. She also appeared as a guest even after a re-break.
Monomane Ōzakettei-sen (CX)
Ano Hito wa Ima!? (NTV) – reporter
Super Jockey (NTV) – occasionally
Yorubijo (5 Apr 2003 – 31 Mar 2007, Sun TV) – regular
Doyō Special (TX) – occasionally
Naruhodo! High School (NTV) – quasi-regular
Dynamic Tsūhan (2008, TBS) – studio panellist
Sunday Japon (2010, TBS) – location quasi-regular
5-Ji ni Muchū! (4 Oct 2011 – 29 Mar 2016, Tokyo MX) – Tuesday regular

Dramas
Nettaiya Academy / Misty Blue (1989, EX)
Umiterashi (13 Nov – 4 Dec 1989, NHK)
Sugishi Hi no Serenade (1989–90, CX)
Ucchan Nanchan no Convenience Monogatari (1990, TX)
Yonimo Kimyōna Monogatari "Yami no Seirei-tachi" (1990, CX)
Dramatic 22 Jōdan Janai yo! My Home (26 Jan 1991, TBS)
High Leg Queen Romance Pit ni Kakeru Koi! (23 Sep 1991, CX)
Nandara Mandara (16 Oct – 18 Dec 1991, CX)
Suteki ni Damashite! (15 Apr – 24 Jun 1992, NTV) – as Linda
Tonosama Fūraibō Kakure Tabi (1994, EX) – as Okyo
Otōsan wa Shinpaishō (12 Apr – 17 May 1994, EX)
Konya, subete no Bar de (7 Jan 1995, NTV)
Moto Rōnin Daikichi Hanayama (1 Apr 1995, EX)
Hitori ni Shinai de (6 Jul – 21 Sep 1995, CX) – as Reiko Sakurai
Doyō Drama Aki no Sentaku (23 Nov 1996, NHK)
Doyō Wide Gekijō Sakura Fubuki Bijin Suri Sanshimai ga Iku (1997, EX) – as Katsumi Sakurafubuki (starring)
Three Sisters Investigate Episode 8 "Hatsukoi wa Kiken na Yūkai!? Shikenmondai Tōnan ni Hime rareta Wana" (1998, NTV)
Abarenbō Shōgun IX Episode 16 "Ōoku no Kaikaku Jō-sama, Ourami Itashimasu!" (1999, EX) – as Ukifune
Asadora Watashi no Aozora (2000, NHK)
Hagure Keiji Junjōha: Dai 14 Series Episode 2 "Yasuura Keiji ga Sakanaya ni Mukoiri!? Nioi o Kagu Onna" (2001, EX)
Bōsan Bengoshi Muei Goda 1 (2003) – Naoe Yamamoto
13-sai no Hello Work Episode 1 (Jan 2012, EX) – as herself
Toranaide Kudasai!! Gravure Idol Ura Monogatari Episode 11 (Mar 2012, TX) – as herself

Advertisements
Showa Note Japonica Gakushū-chō
Pizza-La
Unilever
Mizkan Ajipon – Co-starring Toshiyuki Nishida
JKA Foundation Auto Sport
Fuji-Q Highland
Money Partners
Kincho Gokiburi ga Inaku naru Spray
Big – Co-starring Junji Takada
In addition to the above, there were multiple performances on commercials in Shizuoka Prefecture (Kikuchi Kensetsu, Shizuoka Mitsubishi Motors, etc.) at the time of her old entertainment name (era when she was active in Shizuoka).

Films
Bakayaro! 3: Henna Yatsura  Episode 3 "Kaisha o Name ru na" (1990) – as Nobuko Motoki
Docchi Modocchi (1990) – as woman with red car
Joshū Sasori Satsujin Yokoku V-Cinema (1991) – starring; as Nami Matsushima
Dai Gekitotsu (1993)
Mamushi no Kyōdai (1997) – as Ranko
Katana Karu mono (2008) – as Kyoko Kobayakawa
MR Iyaku Jōhō Tantōsha fourthstage Phase IV V-Cinema (14 Feb 2014)

Music videos
Purple Days "Still think of you"
Cascade "Yasashī Sagi-shi no Negoto no yō ni"
Altima "Burst The Gravity"

Internet
Natsuki ni Muchū! (2 Aug 2011 –, Abema Studio)
Natsuki Okamoto Kisha Kaiken Tokyo Auto Salon 2012 with NAPAC (26 Feb 2012 –, WWS Channel)

Pachinko
CR Natsuki Okamoto no Maboroshi no Suzume Jin Reika (2005, Masamura Yuki)

Discography

Singles
Suru No? Shinai No? / Ikenai Bosanoba (16 Dec 1990, CRDP-8)
Gold / Urami-bushi (1 May 1991, CRDP-13)
Kinu no Kutsushita / Oasis de Onemuri (21 Nov 1991, CRDP-27,  is a cover song by Mari Natsuki)
Sukidakara / Ai wa Kisetsu no naka de (1 Jul 1992, TODT-2874, Shinkon-san Irasshai theme song / duet with Katsura Sanshi (now Katsura Bunshi VI))

Albums
Dakishimete (21 Jul 1990, CRCP-20006)
Dakishimete Destiny
Ikenai Bosanoba
Akuma no sasayaki
Natsu ga Kaeru Koro
TYO from N.Y.
Akuma no sasayaki
Aoi Chiheisen -Blue Horizon-
Motto Heart beat
Tasogare no Please
Kinu no Kutsushita/Best Selection (21 Nov 1991, CRCP-20028)
Kinu no Kutsushita
Water Flower
Dakishimete Destiny
Savage Night
Urami-bushi
Suru No? Shinai No?
Oasis de Onemuri
Gold
Talk Mans: Kyokyojitsujitsu Monogatari (21 Nov 1994, COCC-12072)

Works

Photo albums
Venus (20 Aug 1989 Kindaieigasha) 
Splash (10 Aug 1990 Wani Books) 
Giddy (24 Jun 1991 Hakusensha) 
Hitomi no Doku (10 Nov 1992 Wani Books) 
Nudie (30 Aug 1992 Bauhaus)

Videos
Tropical Wind (20 Jul 1989 Tairiku Shobō) 
Sun Beam (6 May 1990 Tairiku Shobō)

DVD
Nudie (14 Apr 2003 Bauhaus)

References

External links
 
 
 (2 February 2010 – 21 June 2016) 

Japanese gravure idols
Japanese television personalities
Japanese actresses
Japanese women comedians
People from Shizuoka (city)
1965 births
Living people
Japanese women television presenters